Pichincha Canton is a canton of Ecuador, located in the Manabí Province.  Its capital is the town of Pichincha.  Its population at the 2001 census was 29,945.

Demographics
Ethnic groups as of the Ecuadorian census of 2010:
Montubio  57.8%
Mestizo  38.1%
Afro-Ecuadorian  2.1%
White  1.7%
Indigenous  0.1%
Other  0.1%

References

Cantons of Manabí Province